Sir David Brand KCMG (1 August 1912 – 15 April 1979) was an Australian politician. A member of the Liberal Party, he was a Member of the Legislative Assembly of Western Australia from 1945 to 1975, and also the 19th and longest-serving Premier of Western Australia, serving four terms from the 1959 to the 1971 election. He resigned as leader of the Liberal Party in 1973, and retired from politics in 1975, dying from heart disease in 1979.

Early life
David Brand was born in Dongara, Western Australia, the eldest of four children of Albert John Brand, a farmer, and his wife Hilda, née Mitchell. His great-grandfather George Brand, previously a resident of Falkirk, Scotland, arrived in Western Australia on the convict ship Stag in 1855. He settled in the Greenough area. His family joined him in 1859. David Brand's maternal grandfather was Samuel Mitchell, a Cornish immigrant who was a pioneer of the mining industry in Western Australia and served in both houses of state parliament. Brand's parents farmed at Northampton and moved to a farm near Mullewa in 1924. He left school at 14 to work on the farm, and at Mullewa became secretary of the local branch of the Primary Producers' Association, a forerunner of the Farmers Federation.

In 1935, Brand moved to Kalgoorlie and worked at the Golden Horseshoe Mine, as a truck driver, treatment hand, filter specialist and shift boss. In his spare time, he was active in the Methodist Church and as a scoutmaster. Brand was of Cornish descent, like both his predecessor, Albert Hawke, and successor, John Tonkin, as premier.

Military service

Following the outbreak of World War II, Brand enlisted in the Australian Imperial Force on 23 November 1939. As a private, he was assigned to the 2/11th Battalion, part of the 6th Division, which embarked for the Middle East on 20 April 1940. Brand fought in the North African campaign, including the advance on Benghazi, and was promoted to corporal before the 2/11th was sent to the Greek campaign, in which he was seriously wounded on 24 April 1941.

Brand was eventually sent back to Australia for further treatment, arriving in August, and was discharged as medically unfit in April 1942. He was re-mobilised in September, as an instructor with the 7th Battalion, Volunteer Defence Corps, in Geraldton and was promoted to Warrant Officer in January 1943. With the war effort beginning to wind down, Brand was discharged from the army in January 1945.

Civilian life and political career

Brand married Doris Elspeth McNeill at Mingenew Methodist Church on 20 March 1944, with whom he later had three children. After his army discharge, Brand took over the general store at Dongara.

The incumbent Labor member for the State seat of Greenough, John Newton, was killed in action with the RAAF in 1945. Brand won the seat for the Liberal Party in a by-election that year, defeating Newton's brother by a narrow margin. Brand was the first person in Australia to win election to an Australian parliament as a candidate of the newly formed Liberal Party.

In October 1949, Ross McLarty became Premier and Brand entered the Ministry as Minister for Housing, Forests and Local Government. From April 1950 he was Minister for Works, Water Supply and Housing, working to establish the Kwinana Oil Refinery. Brand would later describe this as one of his greatest achievements. He was also involved in the creation of other major industrial projects.

After the Coalition's defeat in 1953, Brand became deputy leader of the Opposition. After McLarty's retirement, Brand was elected party leader on 1 March 1957. The Coalition was returned to power in 1959, and Brand was sworn in as Premier on 2 April. His administration retained office at the elections of 1962, 1965, and 1968. This was achieved with the assistance of the West Australian branch of the Democratic Labor Party (DLP) which split the Labor vote in some metropolitan electorates. The DLP was active in Western Australia between 1959 and 1974.

In 1960, the Federal government lifted its embargo on iron exports, which had been in place since 1938, enabling exploitation of large iron deposits in the Pilbara. The mining of large bauxite deposits in the Darling Scarp also commenced, along with expansion of mineral processing at Kwinana and the South West. Federal finance for the Ord River Scheme was also secured by Brand's government. Substantial oil and gas deposits were discovered in the Pilbara. In 1968, Western Australia ceased to be a net recipient of federal financial assistance. Brand was knighted in June of the following year.

The mining-pastoral boom of the 1960s played a big part in ensuring for Brand's government four successive electoral victories over the ALP opposition (led by Hawke until 1967, and by Tonkin from 1967 to 1971). However, the rapid growth of the Perth metropolitan area, and the strain this put on essential services, eroded the government's popularity, especially after 1969. In addition, Brand's relations with the federal Liberal Party worsened after the retirement of Sir Robert Menzies in 1966. While Brand's administration suffered from a series of controversies relating to environmental, heritage, Aboriginal and housing issues, the impact of production quotas for wheat, imposed by Prime Minister Sir John Gorton led to open conflict with the federal Liberal Party.

In the midst of this conflict the Brand government's attempt to demolish the remains of the Colonial Barracks ("the Barracks Arch") immediately opposite the parliament building led to a parliamentary revolt within the Liberal Party. Brand prevented this by dropping the proposal, and agreeing to allow the National Trust to restore the Arch. However, the strains this had caused within the government became evident when Brand collapsed while speaking publicly in 1971. He recovered, but the Coalition lost the election to Labor by one seat, and Tonkin became Premier.

Brand led the Liberals in opposition until his resignation in 1973; Sir Charles Court succeeded him as the party's leader. He died of heart disease in Carnamah, Western Australia in 1979.

The federal electoral Division of Brand in Western Australia, created in 1984, is named after him, as is the Brand Highway and the Sir David Brand School in Coolbinia. The Sir David Brand Award is the highest award of the West Australian Tourism Awards, in recognition of his work to advance the tourism industry.

In popular culture
Brand made a guest appearance in the film Nickel Queen while Premier of Western Australia.

See also

 Brand–Watts Ministry (1959–1962)
 Brand–Nalder Ministry (1962–1971)

References

External links
Australian Dictionary of Biography

|-

1912 births
1979 deaths
Australian Methodists
Australian people of Cornish descent
Australian people of Scottish descent
Australian Knights Commander of the Order of St Michael and St George
Australian politicians awarded knighthoods
Leaders of the Opposition in Western Australia
Members of the Western Australian Legislative Assembly
People from Dongara, Western Australia
Premiers of Western Australia
Treasurers of Western Australia
Liberal Party of Australia members of the Parliament of Western Australia
20th-century Australian politicians
Australian monarchists 
Australian Army personnel of World War II
Australian Army soldiers
Volunteer Defence Corps soldiers